The 1896 Pittsburgh College football team was an American football team that represented Pittsburgh Catholic College of the Holy Ghost—now known as Duquesne University—during the 1896 college football season.

Schedule

First team

Reserve team

Discrepancies in records
The Duquesne University 2009 football media guide gives the 1896 season record as 12–1 on the basis of games that, according to 1896 newspapers, were played by the reserve (second) team. The guide does not include the first-team schedule or two reserve-team games against the Keystone Tigers (November 24) and Press Young Folks' League (November 26). College Football Data Warehouse lists a similar schedule as in the media guide but omits the win against Allegheny High School and adds a supposed 10–0 loss against the Allegheny Athletic Association on November 10, for a season record of 11–2. Pittsburgh newspapers of 1896 reported that the Allegheny Athletic Association's opponent on November 10 was the Duquesne Country and Athletic Club, with Allegheny winning 12–0.

References

Pittsburgh College
Duquesne Dukes football seasons
Pittsburgh College football